An open secret is a concept, fact, or idea that is widely known yet officially undeclared.

Open Secret(s) may also refer to:
Open Secret, a 1948 film
Open Secrets, a 1994 short story collection by Alice Munro
An Open Secret, a 2014 documentary film
"Open Secrets", a song by Rush from the album Hold Your Fire
OpenSecrets, an American nonprofit
Open Secret, a 1965 book by Wei Wu Wei
Open Secret: Gay Hollywood, 1928-1998, a 1998 book by David Ehrenstein 
Open Secrets: A Memoir of Faith and Discovery, by Richard Lischer
Open Secret: The Autobiography of the Former Director-General of MI5, the autobiography of Stella Rimington
Open Secrets: India's Intelligence Unveiled, a memoir by an Indian intelligence operative
Open Secrets, a 1988 album by Peter Kowald